Aymen Mnafeg (born 15 March 1981) is a Tunisian football midfielder.

References

1981 births
Living people
Tunisian footballers
ES Zarzis players
Espérance Sportive de Tunis players
US Monastir (football) players
AS Kasserine players
EGS Gafsa players
AS Gabès players
CS Hilalien players
CO Médenine players
Association football midfielders
Tunisian Ligue Professionnelle 1 players